Miss World Vietnam (Vietnamese: Hoa hậu Thế giới Việt Nam) is a national beauty pageant in Vietnam that has been held biennially since 2019. Along with Miss Vietnam and Miss Universe Vietnam, Miss World Vietnam is one of the Big Three national beauty pageants.

This contest was first started in 2014 by Elite Vietnam as Miss Aodai Vietnam (Hoa khôi Áo dài Việt Nam) and is now owned by Sen Vàng Entertainment as Miss World Vietnam. The pageant crowned the Vietnam representatives to compete in two of the major international beauty pageants: Miss World and Miss International (alternate with Miss Vietnam).

The current Miss World Vietnam titleholder is Huỳnh Nguyễn Mai Phương from Đồng Nai, who was crowned on August 12, 2022.

History
In 2014, Elite Vietnam plans to hold a new beauty contest called Miss World Vietnam. However, the regulations of the Ministry of Culture - Sports and Tourism of Vietnam only allows the organization of 2 national beauty contest (which literaturely called hoa hậu contests) every year. Since two other hoa hậu competitions have been licensed (Miss Vietnam 2014 and Miss Ocean Vietnam 2014), the organizers named Miss Ao Dai - Road to the Miss World, meaning "Hoa khôi Áo dài". Miss Ao Dai - Road to the Miss World 2014 was held on January 5, 2015.

In Vietnamese language, there are two ways of translation of the word "Miss" but two different meanings and representing two different titles, women who hold the title of hoa hậu have higher social ranking than ones who are called hoa khôi, as well as having more media influence and inspiration. In 2019, Miss Ao Dai - Road to the Miss World was renamed Miss World Vietnam (Hoa hậu Thế giới Việt Nam) organized by Sen Vàng Entertainment.

Titleholders

Regional rankings

Vietnam's Representatives at Miss World
Color keys
The winner of Miss World Vietnam or Miss Vietnam represents her country at the Miss World. On occasion, when the official contest was not held, a winner or a runner-up of other national beauty contests was elected to compete at Miss World by the license holder (currently, Sen Vang Entertainment).

Vietnam's Representatives at Miss International 
Color keys
The 1st runner-up or 2nd runner-up of Miss World Vietnam or Miss Vietnam represents her country at the Miss International. On occasion, when the official contest was not held, a winner or a runner-up of other national beauty contests was elected to compete at Miss International by the license holder (currently, Sen Vang Entertainment).

Representatives at other international pageants 
Color key

Miss Intercontinental

Miss Asia Pacific International

World Miss University

Past Franchises

Miss Supranational

The Miss Globe

Miss Grand International

See also

 Miss Vietnam
 Miss Universe Vietnam
 Miss Earth Vietnam
 Miss Grand Vietnam
 Miss Supranational Vietnam
 Miss Vietnam World
 Mister Vietnam
 Vietnam at major beauty pageants

References

Beauty pageants in Vietnam
Recurring events established in 2014